Landvættir ("land wights") are spirits of the land in Norse mythology and Germanic neopaganism. They protect and promote the flourishing of the specific places where they live, which can be as small as a rock or a corner of a field or as large as a section of a country.

The nature of landvættir
Some scholars have suggested that landvættir are chthonic in nature, spirits of the dead, but others have interpreted them as nature spirits, since they sometimes live in land that has never been populated. Hilda Ellis Davidson argued that stories such as that of Goat-Björn imply that they were already there when the settlers arrived in Iceland. Goat-Björn was offered a partnership by a "rock-dweller" (bergbúi) and thereafter prospered. People with second sight saw "all the land-spirits" following him to the thing and following his brothers hunting and fishing. They told of people worshiping and receiving advice from spirits living in waterfalls, woods, and rocks.

Jörmundur Ingi Hansen, former High Priest of the Ásatrúarfélagið, said that landvættir are "spirits and they in some way control the safety of the land, the fertility of the land, and so on."  According to him, they are "tied to a spot in the landscape, to a huge rock, to a mountain, or to a specially beautiful place" and that place can be recognized by being more beautiful than "just a few yards away."

The belief in local landvættir lives on in Iceland, with many farms having rocks that are not mowed closely and on which children are not allowed to play. When construction was about to start on Keflavík air base, the Icelandic foreman dreamed that a woman came to him asking to delay moving a boulder to give her family time to move out. He did so for two weeks over American objections until she came to him in another dream telling him the landvættir were all out.

Other terms are sometimes used in the texts for the spirits, such as bergbúi, ármaðr, and spámaðr, but there is one mention of pre-Christian Icelanders bringing offerings specifically to landvættir. In a section of Hauksbók, a Christian bishop rails against "foolish women" who take food out to rocks and hollows to feed the landvættir in hopes of being blessed with a prosperous household.

Wealth and weal of the land
One version of the Icelandic Book of Settlement says that the ancient law of Iceland forbade having a dragon-prow in place on one's ship in harbor or coming in to land "with gaping mouth or yawning snout" because the landvættir would be frightened away.

In Egils saga, Egil Skallagrímsson set up a nithing pole to agitate the landvættir in Norway so that they would "go astray . . . until they have driven King Eric and Queen Gunnhild" out of the country.  Hermann Pálsson and Paul Edwards translate landvættir as "guardian spirits" in this passage.

The four landvættir of Iceland
Iceland is protected by four great guardians who are known as the four landvættir.

According to the Saga of King Olaf Tryggvason in Heimskringla, King Harald Bluetooth Gormsson of Denmark, intending to invade Iceland, had a wizard send his spirit out in the form of a whale to scout it out for points of vulnerability.  Swimming westwards around the northern coast, the wizard saw that all the hillsides and hollows were full of landvættir, "some large and some small."  He swam up Vopnafjörður, intending to go ashore, but a great dragon came flying down the valley toward him, followed by many snakes, insects, and lizards, all spitting poison at him. So he went back and continued around the coast westward to Eyjafjörður, where he again swam inland. This time he was met by a great bird, so big that its wings touched the hillsides on either side, with many other birds large and small following it. Retreating again and continuing west and south, he swam into Breiðafjörður. There he was met by a huge bull, bellowing horribly, with many landvættir following it. He retreated again, continued south around Reykjanes, and tried to come ashore at Vikarsskeið, but there he encountered a mountain giant (bergrisi), his head higher than the hill-tops, with an iron staff in his hand and followed by many other giants (jötnar). He continued along the south coast but saw nowhere else where a longship could put in, "nothing but sands and wasteland and high waves crashing on the shore."

The four landvættir are traditionally regarded as the protectors of the  four quarters of Iceland: the dragon (Dreki) in the east,  the eagle (Gammur) in the north, the bull (Griðungur) in the west, and the giant (Bergrisi) in the south.

A simple and elegant parallelism can be made with respect to the four air radar stations of the Iceland Air Defence System:
 H-1 Miðnesheiði: the Bull Griðungur
 H-2A Langanes: the Dragon Dreki
 H3: Höfn: the Gigant Bergrisi
 H-4A Bolungarvík: the Eagle Gammur

The four landvættir of Iceland are depicted on the Icelandic coat of arms, on the obverse of the Icelandic króna coins, and the team crest of Iceland's national football teams.

See also
 Adgilis Deda, a Georgian divinity with a comparable function
 Genius loci
 Kami, Japanese divinities with similar properties
 Landdísir, female spirits of the land attested as venerated in Iceland
 Tuatha Dé Danann
 Tutelary deity
 Vættir

References

Creatures in Norse mythology
Tutelary deities
Nature spirits
Chthonic beings